The Zselicszentjakab Abbey was a Benedictine monastery established at Zselicszentjakab (now Kaposszentjakab) in Somogy County in the Kingdom of Hungary in 1061. Its founder was the Palatine Otto of the Győr clan. The monastery was dedicated to the Apostle Saint James the Great. The deed of the foundation of the monastery – drafted by George, Bishop of Veszprém – is the first extant charter issued by a nobleman in the Kingdom of Hungary.

References

Sources

External links

Győr (genus)
Benedictine monasteries in Hungary